USS Phlox was a steamer commissioned by the Union Navy during the American Civil War.  She served the Union Navy's struggle against the Confederate States of America as a gunboat; and, after the war's end, she served the midshipmen at the United States Naval Academy in Annapolis, Maryland, as a training ship.

Steamer constructed in Boston, Massachusetts, in 1864 

Phlox, a wooden side wheel steamer built at Boston, Massachusetts, in 1864 as F. W. Lincoln, was purchased by the Union Navy from McKay & Aldus 2 August 1864; renamed Phlox the same day; and commissioned at Boston Navy Yard 14 September 1864, Act. Ens. Douglas F. O’Brien in command.

Assigned to the North Atlantic blockade 
 
Assigned to the North Atlantic Blockading Squadron, Phlox steamed south late in September and operated in the James River helping maintain communications among the Union ships, supporting General Ulysses S. Grant’s operations against Richmond, Virginia.

Supporting the attack on Fort Fisher 

In January 1865 she steamed to Wilmington, North Carolina, to support the joint Army–Navy attack on Fort Fisher, North Carolina, which doomed Wilmington.

After Fort Fisher fell, Phlox returned to the James River where she served through the end of the war.

Post-war service with the U.S. Naval Academy in Annapolis 

Phlox decommissioning at the Washington Navy Yard 28 July 1865. Later that year Phlox was moved to Annapolis, Maryland, and subsequently served in a non-commissioned status as practice ship for midshipmen at the U.S. Naval Academy until 1873.

References  

Ships of the Union Navy
Ships built in Boston
Steamships of the United States Navy
Gunboats of the United States Navy
American Civil War patrol vessels of the United States
United States Naval Academy
Training ships of the United States Navy
1864 ships